Scandinavian Mexicans are citizens of Mexico of full or partial Scandinavian ancestry. The Scandinavian countries (Denmark, Norway and Sweden) have an intertwined history and shared cultural traits.

History 

The first notable Dane and Scandinavian in what would become Mexico was Fray Jacobo Daciano, a younger brother of Christian II of Denmark, who settled in Michoacán in the mid-16th century, evangelized the region and became known for his love of the native Tarascans. In 1841 while studying the plants of southern Mexico, Danish scientist Federico Miguel Liebman came across a small group of natives in Oaxaca that spoke an archaic form of Danish. Through interviews with the oldest members of the community, Liebman came to conclude that these individuals were the descendants of Danish pirates that had been abandoned by their crew in the late 16th century and had entered into unions with native women. Swedes have been present in Mexico since at least the 1890s. The National Archival Services of Norway has records of individual Norwegians in Mexico in the late 19th and early 20th centuries. 

During his voyage on the Norway-Mexico Gulf Line beginning in 1907, writer Peter Lykke-Seest spoke positevly of a "colony" of Norwegian businessmen in Veracruz; they were well-dressed, educated "gentlemen and ladies" that retained Norwegian customs. This stands in contrast to Lykke-Seest's negative feelings for "naive" farmers in a project founded by Otto Sverdrup in Cuba. He makes no mention of more humble Norwegians, like sailors, that would have been present in the port city. Lykke-Seest wrote positively of Mexico's resources and the economic stability provided by Porfirio Diaz's government and urged Norwegians to venture in the country before they were crowded out. He also mentioned the prospect of establishing  modern (rationale) farming colonies- his view on these colonies may have been influenced by the Porfirian government. Correspondences between shipowner Gottfred M. Bryde and officials in Mexico, including Michael Strøm Lie, suggest the Norway-Mexico Gulf Line planned to ship Norwegian farmers. After five years of negotiations, a contract was drawn up by the government and the Norway-Mexico Gulf Line in 1912 for the shipping of "colonists" and wooden houses, but due to the outbreak of the Mexican Revolution, was never signed. As a result of the war, Norwegian presence more than halved between 1910 and 1921. Only three to six hundred Norwegians moved to Mexico before 1940.

According to the National Institute of Migration, in 2009 there were 633 Sweden-born residents in Mexico. In the same year there were 404 Denmark-born residents and 240 Norway-born residents. The majority of these individuals lived in the Mexico City Metropolitan Area.

Notable individuals

 Swedish 
 Axel Didriksson- writer and professor at UNAM
 Rosa Lie Johansson- painter
 Víctor Lojero Alexanderson- footballer
 Anne Marie Thistler- former Miss Sweden
 Yolanda "Tongolele" Montes- exotic dancer
 Aline Pettersson - writer
 Julieta Rosen- actress
 Nena von Schlebrügge- model
 Waldemar Sjölander- artist
 Christopher von Uckermann- singer

 Danish 
 Frans Blom- archeologist
 Sairi Forsman- sculptor 
 Rosario María Gutiérrez Eskildsen- lexicographer, linguist, educator
 Ann Margarit Henningsen- sprint canoer
 Cynthia Klitbo- actress
 Edvard Emile Langberg - general
 Miguel Ostersen- footballer
 Greer Skousen- basketball player

 Norwegian 
 Ola Apenes- archeologist
 Eva Norvind- writer and actress
 Nailea Norvind- actress
 Mario Schjetnan- architect

See also
 Immigration to Mexico
 Denmark–Mexico relations
 Mexico–Norway relations
 Mexico–Sweden relations

References

 
European Mexican
Mexico
Mexico
Mexico
Mexican